Denis Vladimirovich Volotka (born 10 October 1985) is a cross country skier from Kazakhstan. He competed for Kazakhstan at the 2014 Winter Olympics in the cross country skiing events.

References

1985 births
Living people
Olympic cross-country skiers of Kazakhstan
Cross-country skiers at the 2014 Winter Olympics
Cross-country skiers at the 2018 Winter Olympics
Kazakhstani male cross-country skiers
Tour de Ski skiers
Universiade medalists in cross-country skiing
People from Akmola Region
Universiade bronze medalists for Kazakhstan
Competitors at the 2011 Winter Universiade
21st-century Kazakhstani people